Henry Binney Hawke (October 1827 – 17 March 1904), usually referred to as H. B. Hawke, was an industrialist in Kapunda, South Australia, founder of the manufacturing business which became H. B. Hawke & Co.

History 
Hawke was born in Cornwall, orphaned and reputedly raised by a family of smugglers. He migrated to South Australia, arriving in South Australia in January 1849 aboard the William Money at a time of tremendous migration (11,000 in two years 1848–1849) from Britain. He found work with William Pybus's Victoria Foundry on Hindley Street, and within two years was able to purchase a property at the corner of Cambridge and Tynte streets, North Adelaide.
William Pybus, sen. (c. 1799–1854) and his son William Pybus, jun. (1820–1885) established the Victoria Foundry on Hindley Street, Adelaide, best known for casting bells, but also worked with cast iron from 1843. A grandson, W. R. Pybus (1848–1917), was a noted musician.  
He is reported as joining the rush to the Victorian goldfields around 1850 and may have had some success, as in January 1852 he was able to marry Christina Rayner, an 18-year-old fellow passenger on the William Money.
He moved to Kapunda, where he took over the foundry associated with the Adamson Brothers' farm machinery works. What year the Adamson Brothers factory started there has not been found, but Hawke established his foundry ("a very small thing") there in 1857. Certainly both were operating as separate businesses in 1860 when The Northern Star, the town's first newspaper, started up. Nor is the nature of the "takeover" known, but it is likely Adamson was pleased to outsource the whole process (patternmaking, mould making and casting) to specialists.

The first major cast iron product of the North Kapunda (later simply Kapunda) Foundry was a weighbridge table, weighing  in May 1859. For a hundred years, through changes of managers and ownership, the company's weighbridges remained a staple product, along with large water pumps such as those on the River Murray, crushing plants (including the prototype Saunders Rapid stamp mill), road rollers, hydraulic presses and car hoists.
They cast a pit-head wheel weighing six or seven tons for BHP. He was the first to use Kapunda marble as a flux in smelting, which material was at his instigation also used by the smelters at Broken Hill.
In agricultural machinery they produced the "Advance" mowing machine (the State's first), and Hawke's Patent broadcast seed-sower.

Personal
Hawke was a well-known and respected townsman and appreciated for the business and employment he brought to the town. 
He took a lively interest in town affairs, but suffered socially on account of profound deafness. In later years the only way of communicating with him was by writing. He took a great interest in scientific advances, and devoted much of his spare time to reading and mechanical inventions.

In June 1884 he sold the Kapunda Foundry and retired to Port Lincoln, then in 1891 he returned to Kapunda. He died suddenly at the North Kapunda Hotel, where he was enjoying a game of billiards with his son Harold. A longtime friend, with whom he was conversing just half an hour earlier, said he was in his usual good spirits.
Henry Binney Hawke was one of the engineering innovators who played an active part in the economic development of early South Australia. His contemporaries included Alfred Simpson, John Ridley, Joseph Mellor, John Stokes Bagshaw, Adam Adamson, David Thompson, James Martin, Robert Cameron, David and John Shearer and the May brothers. These men were inventors and manufacturers of machinery and processes for the growing South Australian agricultural and mining industries. They also provided hardware to enable the construction of infrastructure such as bridges, water management and major buildings. 
Julia Segaran H. B. Hawke of Kapunda - A biographical essay
His remains were buried at the Kapunda cemetery.

H. B. Hawke & Co.
The new owners, who immediately renamed it H. B. Hawke & Co., were local businessmen William Thomas (c. 1854 – 5 November 1900) and his brother-in-law Rees Rees (c. 1855 – 24 August 1935), both of whom would serve as mayors of Kapunda.

In September 1895 William Thomas resigned, selling his share to David James. They remained business partners until 1903 when Rees became sole proprietor, and remained in the Rees family until 1983.

Family
Hawke married Christina Rayner (c. 1835 – 25 August 1866), a fellow-passenger on the William Money, in January 1852. They had two surviving daughters:
 Evelyn Faith "Eva" Hawke (1855–1923) married Richard Randall Knuckey ( –1914) of HMCS on 14 November 1877. She was postmistress, Greenock and Truro.

 Amy Lilian "Lily" Hawke (1862– ) married Charles William France on 18 July 1883, lived in Laverton, Western Australia.
He married again in 1868, to Julia Barkla (1840 – 20 June 1917). Their children include
 D'Arcy Melvin Hawke (1870-1926), of the Telegraph Department
 Ida Vanessa Eulalie Hawke (1871–1936) of Kapunda
 Ethel Maud Hawke (1873– ) married George Thomas Bleechmore on 23 January 1901, lived in Brisbane, Queensland
 Harold Binney Hawke (15 July 1878 – 7 February 1963) married Clarice Kate Hales (1883–1975)
 Herbert Tyndal Hawke (1880– )
 (Julia Ruby) Stella Hawke (1884–1965) married Walter Cecil Marsden in 1905

Albert Hawke, premier of Western Australia, was born in Kapunda son of James Renfrey Hawke and Elizabeth Ann Blinman née Pascoe, and both of Cornish descent, but not closely related.

Further reading
Rob Charlton (1971) History of Kapunda
Not Without Courage (1957) Hawke & Co Centenary booklet

Recognition 
The Kapunda Museum's Hawke Gallery features a range of agricultural machinery including a Hawke cross-compound steam engine.

References 

1827 births
1904 deaths
Australian ironmasters
Australian manufacturing businesspeople
19th-century Australian inventors
19th-century Australian businesspeople
19th-century ironmasters